Collinsite is a mineral with chemical formula . It was discovered in British Columbia, Canada, and formally described in 1927. It was named in honor of William Henry Collins (1878–1937), director of the Geological Survey of Canada. There are three varieties of the mineral: magnesian collinsite, zincian collinsite, and strontian collinsite. The crystal structure consists of polyhedral chains linked by weak hydrogen bonds.

Description

Collinsite is translucent and brown, chocolate-black, light brown, yellowish white, white, or colorless. It is colorless in thin section and light yellow-brown to colorless in transmitted light. The zincian variety of collinsite is pale blue.

Collinsite is a member of the fairfieldite group. Hillite is the zinc analogue of collinsite and collinsite is the magnesium analogue of messelite.

Varieties
There are three varieties of collinsite:
magnesian collinsite, 
zincian collinsite, 
strontian collinsite, 
Magnesian collinsite was described from South Dakota in 1972, zincian collinsite was described from South Australia in 1973, and strontian collinsite was described from Russia as early as 1965. The replacement of calcium by strontium that occurs in strontian collinsite is atypical of collinsite.

Structure
The crystal structure of collinsite was determined using essentially pure magnesian collinsite, Ca2Mg(PO4)2·2H2O, and published in 1974. It consists of chains of corner-sharing (MgΦ6) octahedra and (PO4) tetrahedra. Four of the Mg ligands link to (PO4) groups and the other two to water molecules. Two of the ligands in the (PO4) group link to (MgΦ6) octahedra and the other two link to calcium atoms and act as hydrogen bond acceptors. Weak hydrogen bonds link chains together and force separation between them. The separation gives room for interstitial, eight-coordinated calcium between chains.

History

Collinsite was discovered prior to 1927 near François Lake, British Columbia. The phosphate layers were composed of a mineral named quercyite (since determined to be improperly classified) and the new mineral collinsite. The François Lake collinsite was light-brown and consisted of sub-centimeter blades.

Collinsite was named in honor of William Henry Collins (1878–1937) who, at the time, was director of the Geological Survey of Canada. The mineral was described by Eugene Poitevin in 1927 in a publication of the Geological Survey. Since no crystals of collinsite were found, the only crystallographic information determined was the angle between cleavages.

In 1940, C. W. Wolfe reexamined the mineral species. Wolfe also questioned the four cleavages found by Poitevin, since he could identify only two fair cleavages from six fibrous crystals.

When the IMA was founded, messelite was grandfathered as a valid mineral species.

Occurrence
Collinsite has been found in Australia, Austria, Bahamas, Brazil, Canada, Germany, Namibia, Norway, Romania, Russia, South Africa, Spain, and the United States. The mineral formed as an incrustation of other minerals by weathering. It occurs in association with bitumen, bobierrite, carbonate rich fluoroapatite, cryptomelane, dolomite, Fe–Mn oxides, kovdorskite, parahopeite, and scholzite.

References

Bibliography

Further reading

External links

Triclinic minerals
Calcium minerals
Magnesium minerals
Iron(II) minerals
Phosphate minerals
Hydrates
Minerals in space group 2